Marcel Herrmann Telles (born 23 February 1950) is a Brazilian investor and businessman. Telles is a board member of AB InBev.

Career
Telles shares control of Anheuser-Busch InBev, the world's largest beer company, with his longtime billionaire partners Jorge Paulo Lemann and Carlos Alberto Sicupira. Their investment firm 3G Capital bought Hamburger chain Burger King in 2010. The trio also controls Brazilian retailer Lojas Americanas. He is co-founder and board member of 3G Capital since late 2004, controlling shareholder, former Chairman and CEO of AmBev and Board Member of Anheuser-Busch InBev.

Telles was hired by Banco Garantia in 1972. He was partner of Garantia Merchant Bank from 1974 until it was sold to Credit Suisse First Boston in July 1998. Telles was Head Trader from 1974 to 1989, Board Member of Burger King, Board Member of Lojas Americanas, Partner of GP Investimentos (Brazilian private equity firm) until 2004. He has a BA from Federal University of Rio de Janeiro, and completed the OPM program at Harvard University. He served as CEO of Brahma from 1989 to 1999.

Personal life
Telles is married and has two children.

See also
 List of Brazilians by net worth

References

1950 births
Living people
Businesspeople from Rio de Janeiro (city)
Brazilian billionaires
Brazilian chief executives
Brazilian expatriates in Monaco